St John Bosco College is an independent systemic Roman Catholic co-educational secondary day school, located in Engadine, a southern suburb of Sydney, New South Wales, Australia.

The college was founded in 1978 under the name St John Bosco High School.

History
The school was built after many years of planning and effort by the Parish Priest, John Briffa SDB, and a group of parishioners. The school's principal was once always a Salesian priest, but this changed in 2010 following the departure of Fr Bernie Graham. The methods of teaching at the school are based on John Bosco's theories of education.

The school was a Years 7 to 10, co-educational school under the name St John Bosco High School until 1998 when the school accepted its first Year 11 students and was renamed St John Bosco College.

The first class to graduate from St John Bosco College was in 1999. The inaugural College Captains were Ryan Della Ca and Elizabeth Favaloro.

Patron
The patron of the College is Saint John Bosco, an Italian saint from the 1800s who modelled his teaching methods on the practices of Saint Francis de Sales (therefore his pedagogy and charism are called Salesian).

Symbols

Motto
The motto of the College is Gaudium et Spes ("Joy and Hope"). The motto is an extract from the "Pastoral Constitution on the Church in the Modern World".
<blockquote>
The joy and hope, the grief and anguish of the people of our time, especially of those who are poor or afflicted in any way, are the joy and the hope, the grief and anguish of the followers of Christ as well ... Nothing that is genuinely human fails to find an echo in their hearts.<ref> PASTORAL CONSTITUTION ON THE CHURCH IN THE MODERN WORLD</u> DECEMBER 7, 1965</ref></blockquote>

Badge
The College badge has a plain white cross with the words "Bosco" (which the school is commonly referred to as) and "Gaudium Et Spes" (the school motto, "Joy and Hope"). The background is dark green.

House banners
As of 2008 new house banners were introduced to the school. These were chosen from a banner making competition and replaced the old house flags. Along with the new banners every student was given badges for their house with the image of their house's banner.

Construction work
In 2006 a new classroom block, the Ciantar Block, was completed and named after Fr Joseph Ciantar, who was the pioneer of the Salesian Mission in Engadine. A new basketball court was also completed, called the Reichel Court, which was named in memory of teacher Chris Reichel. The court was built using a sum of money Reichel left to the school.

During 2015 and 2016 a new hall and assembly area with an attached Fitness Studio were built, as well as a Technical & Applied Studies (TAS) block on the site of the old hall.  During 2017 the old TAS rooms were converted into a Learning Centre, music & drama rooms plus general classrooms.

Notable alumni
 Lindsay McDougall - Australian musician and radio personality

See also 

 List of Catholic schools in New South Wales
 Catholic education in Australia

References

External links
St John Bosco College website
Bosco Parish website

Catholic secondary schools in Sydney
Educational institutions established in 1978
Salesian schools
Sutherland Shire
1978 establishments in Australia